The 2013–14 season was Liverpool Football Club's 122nd season in existence and their 52nd consecutive season in the top flight of English football. This was also the club's 22nd consecutive season in the Premier League. Along with the Premier League, Liverpool also competed in the FA Cup and Football League Cup.

Liverpool enjoyed a memorable season, scoring 101 league goals; the highest number of goals scored by a Premier League runner-up and also the fourth highest number of goals ever scored in the Premier League, as of 2020.

Luis Suárez finished as the league's top scorer with 31 goals, winning the Premier League Golden Boot as well as the PFA Players' Player of the Year, while Daniel Sturridge was the league's second highest scorer with 21. Steven Gerrard topped the official Premier League assists chart with 13. 

Liverpool had a pre-season dominated by speculation about whether Luis Suárez would leave the club. Suárez had served four matches of a ten-match ban for biting Branislav Ivanović in the previous season, and Arsenal reportedly agreed terms and offered £40,000,001 for the player based on a rumoured £40 million release clause in Suárez's contract. Suárez stated he would like to leave the club and was then told to train away from the first-team squad. On 8 August, Liverpool owner John W. Henry stated that Suárez would not be allowed to leave the club.

A Simon Mignolet penalty save on the opening day gave Liverpool the first of three 1–0 victories to begin the season. A subsequent draw and loss saw Liverpool drop to fifth place on the table when Suárez completed his ban. From the next match until the end of the season, Liverpool would average 2.9 goals per game. They were top of the table at Christmas before back-to-back 2–1 losses at Manchester City and Chelsea.

A 5–1 win over Arsenal on 5 February featured four Liverpool goals in the opening 20 minutes and was to be the first of an 11-game winning run that included Liverpool beating their title rival, Manchester City, on 13 April, in the same week as the 25th anniversary of the Hillsborough disaster. A subsequent mid-week Manchester City draw meant Liverpool would win the league if they got ten points from their remaining 4 games.

Their next match was a 2–3 away win at Norwich City that secured Liverpool's pre-season aim of qualifying for the 2014–15 UEFA Champions League. However, the subsequent 0–2 home defeat to Chelsea put the title back in Manchester City's favour due to their significantly better goal difference. That pivotal match was marred by Chelsea's "comically brazen" time-wasting, that went unpunished until the 93rd minute by Martin Atkinson (despite José Mourinho telling his players he wanted "at least two bookings for time-wasting before half-time"), and it is foremost known for a Steven Gerrard slip that led to Chelsea's key goal by Demba Ba. Gerrard has spoken of his anguish over the slip, saying it was "even tougher than what people probably think it was". Other key moments cited as playing a part in Liverpool falling short of the title include Raheem Sterling incorrectly having a goal disallowed at Manchester City's Etihad Stadium despite being on-side by over a metre, Kolo Touré passing the ball to Victor Anichebe allowing West Bromwich Albion to earn a draw on 2 February and Jordan Henderson's 93rd minute sending-off (and associated three-match ban) in the home game versus Manchester City, which Liverpool manager Brendan Rodgers thought was "a huge miss for us" because Liverpool "couldn't replace Jordan".

Liverpool's attempts to reverse Manchester City's +9 goal difference advantage in their penultimate game against Crystal Palace saw their initial 0–3 lead pegged back to a 3–3 draw. Liverpool finished in second place, two points behind Manchester City, after they defeated Newcastle United on the final day. This represented the closest the club had come to winning the league title since 1990.

The season was the first since 1995–96 without Jamie Carragher, who retired after the 2012–13 season.

First team

As it stands on 11 May 2014

Transfers and loans

Transfers in

Loans in

Transfers out

Loans out

Transfer summary

Spending

Summer:  £44,800,000

Winter:  £0

Total:  £44,800,000

Income

Summer:  £28,000,000

Winter:  £0

Total:  £28,000,000

Expenditure

Summer:  £16,800,000

Winter:  £0

Total:  £16,800,000

Pre-season and friendlies

Competitions

Overall

Premier League

This season recorded an all-time high mark of goals scored by Liverpool not only in Premier League seasons, but in all their English top flight seasons. Only in 1895–96 Division 2 did the Reds score more league goals over the course of a season – 106 versus 101 they netted this season.

League table

Results summary

Results by matchday

Matches

Aggregate scores

FA Cup

League Cup

Squad statistics

Appearances

Numbers in parentheses denote appearances as substitute.
Players with no appearances not included in the list.

Goalscorers
Includes all competitive matches. The list is sorted by shirt number when total goals are equal.

Disciplinary record

Awards
The inaugural Players' Awards dinner was held on 6 May at the Liverpool ACC Conference Centre.

Liverpool Player's Player of the Year Award: Luis Suárez
Liverpool Supporter's Player of the Year Award: Luis Suárez
Liverpool Supporter's Young Player of the Year Award: Raheem Sterling
Goal of the Season Award: Luis Suárez for his 40-yard volley against Norwich City on 4 December.
Outstanding Achievement Award: Brendan Rodgers
Academy Players' Player of the Year: Jordan Rossiter 
Lifetime Achievement Award: Ronnie Moran

Standard Chartered Player of the Month

Notes

References

External links
2013–14 Liverpool F.C. season at official website
2013–14 Liverpool F.C. season at LFC History

Liverpool
Liverpool F.C. seasons